The Sarawak Sovereignty Movement or SSM is an apolitical  which was officially launched in Kuching, Sarawak on 13 April 2013.

Sarawak Sovereignty Movement spokesman Dato Morshidi Abdul Rahman said that the people had "had enough of the lop-sided development between the peninsula and Sarawak", and that something needed to be done about it. He explained, "We are a civil movement and apolitical. We are not militants or extremists. Sarawak is one of the partners that form Malaysia. The others are Malaya and Sabah. We just want equality of all Sarawakians regardless of their races."

The movement believes that the terms and conditions for the formation of Malaysia gave Sarawak, North Borneo, Malaya, and Singapore the status of equal partners in the newly formed Malaysia, in 1963.

Activities 
The Sarawak Sovereignty Movement and Borneo Heritage Foundation have co-operated in a series of Sarawak and Sabah Merdeka celebrations. The organisation was also present and involved with various carnivals and events intended to celebrate Malaysia Day in 2013.

See also
 Malaysia Agreement 
 Malaysia Act 1963
 North Borneo Federation
 18-point agreement 
 20-point agreement
 Kuching Declaration

References 

Political movements in Sarawak
2013 establishments in Sarawak
Events in Sarawak